This is a list of major perpetrators of the Holocaust.

References 

Perpetrators
Perpetrators
Holocaust perpetrators
Lists of criminals